C. E. Morgan (born 1976) is an American author. She was a finalist for the 2017 Pulitzer Prize for Fiction for The Sport of Kings, winner of the 2016 Kirkus Prize and Windham–Campbell Literature Prize, and in 2009 was named a 5 under 35 honoree by the National Book Foundation.

Biography
As an undergraduate, Morgan studied voice at Berea College, a tuition-free labor college for students from poor and working-class backgrounds in Appalachia. In exchange for a free education, all students work for the college while enrolled. Morgan also attended Harvard Divinity School, where she studied literature and religion. She wrote All the Living while at Harvard. She lives in Kentucky.

Awards and honors
2009 National Book Foundation "5 under 35" award
2010 Lannan Literary Fellowship
2012 United States Artists Fellow award 
2013 Whiting Award
2016 Windham–Campbell Literature Prizes (Fiction)
2016 Kirkus Prize (Fiction)
2017 Pulitzer Prize for Fiction Finalist

Bibliography

Novels
 All the Living (2009)
 The Sport of Kings (2016)

Short stories
 "Over by Christmas", The New York Times, December 24, 2008
 "Twins", The New Yorker, June 14–21, 2010
 "My Friend, Nothing Is In Vain", Oxford American, Spring 2014

Essays and other writings
 "Foreword", Light in August by William Faulkner (Modern Library, 2002)
 "Introduction", A Circle in the Fire & Other Stories by Flannery O'Connor (Folio Society, 2013)

References

External links
An Interview with Morgan
5 Great Books Chosen by Morgan

1976 births
Living people
21st-century American novelists
American women novelists
Novelists from Kentucky
Berea College alumni
Harvard Divinity School alumni
American women short story writers
21st-century American women writers
21st-century American short story writers
Kirkus Prize winners